Bocharki is a rural locality (a selo) in Karachevsky District, Bryansk Oblast, Russia. The population was 18 as of 2010. There are 2 streets.

Geography 
Bocharki is located 25 km southeast of Karachev (the district's administrative centre) by road. Amozovsky is the nearest rural locality.

References 

Rural localities in Karachevsky District